Tecno may refer to:
Tecno brega, a form of music from Brazil
Tecno Fes,  extended play by electronica and dance music DJ Gigi D'Agostino
Tecno (motorsport), Italian racing car constructor
Tecno Mobile, a Chinese phone company

See also
Techno